Many journalists compared the events of the 2023 Brazilian Congress attack to the January 6 United States Capitol attack. Several newspapers, including O Globo, Veja, and Folha de S.Paulo, characterised what happened as terrorism. O Estado de S. Paulo and El Mundo described the event as an attempted coup d'état. On 9 January, tens of thousands of people attended rallies against the rioters in many Brazilian cities.

Domestic

Government 

President Luiz Inácio Lula da Silva condemned the demonstrators as "fascists" in a tweet and called their actions "barbarism". He said that "there was, I would say, incompetence, bad will, bad faith, on the part of the people who take care of public security in the Federal District". Minister of Planning and Budget Simone Tebet called for "exemplary punishments" for the protestors on Twitter. She added that "the Federal Constitution supports our Ministers of Justice and Defense in the use of all rigorous legitimate means for the defense of order, society and democracy". Lula returned to Brasília after the buildings were cleared and visited the Supreme Court and the presidential palace.

President of the Chamber of Deputies Arthur Lira condemned the attacks and called for punishment of those involved. The Vice-President of the Chamber of Deputies, Luciano Bivar (UNIÃO), stated that there would be reinforcement of the military police, with new contingents sent to the National Congress and the Planalto Palace.

Minister of Justice Flávio Dino, President of the Federal Senate Rodrigo Pacheco and Vice-President Geraldo Alckmin also criticised the attack on social media.

The Brazilian superior courts released a joint note to condemn the 8 January attacks:

Parties and politicians 
National President of the Workers' Party Gleisi Hoffmann said that "the DF government (of Ibaneis Rocha) was irresponsible in the face of the invasion of Brasília and the National Congress."

Liberal Party head Valdemar Costa Neto said, "Today is a sad day for the Brazilian nation. We cannot agree with the plundering of the national Congress. All orderly demonstrations are legitimate. Disorder has never been part of our nation's principles. I want to tell you that we vehemently disapprove of this type of attitude and let the law be enforced, strengthening our democracy" but also denied that the protestors were affiliated with or represented Bolsonaro. On 11 January, he stated that any member of the party involved in the attack would be expelled.

Bolsonaro himself condemned the rioters in a tweet and denied responsibility. On 10 January, he claimed in a video that Lula had lost the election but deleted it soon afterwards. Supporters of Bolsonaro, like Senator Carlos Portinho, denounced acts of violence. Portinho, however, blamed the legal "superpowers" of Supreme Federal CourtJudge Alexandre de Moraes for the aggressive protests, calling for their removal to "appease" the protestors. Another Bolsonaro supporter, former federal judge and the senator for Paraná, Sergio Moro (UNIÃO), said that "The new Lula government began more concerned with repressing protests and dissenting opinions than with presenting results. The unrestricted political allocation of ministries and state companies is back. All in favor of a mysterious "reconstruction" without any direction. It is not a good start." Flávio Bolsonaro, a senator and the eldest son of the former President, denied any relationship between the protestors and his father in leaked WhatsApp messages. Other Bolsonaro-aligned politicions, such as Federal Deputy Gustavo Gayer (PL), Governor of São Paulo Tarcísio de Freitas (REPUBLICANOS), Governor of Paraná Ratinho Júnior (PSD), Governor of Goiás Ronaldo Caiado (UNIÃO), Governor of Rio de Janeiro Cláudio Castro (PL), Governor of Minas Gerais Romeu Zema (NOVO), National President of the Republicanos Marcos Pereira and Senator-elect Hamilton Mourão (REPUBLICANOS) condemned the acts of vandalism, but the majority of the pro-Bolsonaro parties and politicians remained silent.

Senator Randolfe Rodrigues (REDE), Senator Jean Paul Prates(PT), Governor of Rio Grande do Sul Eduardo Leite (PSDB), Governor of Pará Helder Barbalho (MDB), former governor of Amapá Waldez Góes (PDT), National President of the Social Democratic Party Gilberto Kassab, as well as Federal Deputies Marcelo Freixo (PT),  (PT) and André Janones (AVANTE) condemned the attacks, with some characterising them as domestic terrorism. Former presidential candidate Ciro Gomes (PDT) classified the acts as one of the greatest "crimes in the history of the Republic", and encouraged punishments in their "maximum rigor of the law" for those responsible.

International 
The attack was widely condemned by foreign governments and international organisations, especially in Latin America.

Africa

Americas 
The Secretary General of the Organisation of American States (OAS), Luis Almagro, stated, "We condemn the attack on the institutions in Brasília, which constitutes a reprehensible action and a direct attack on democracy. These actions are inexcusable and fascist in nature." The OAS also convened a special meeting of its Permanent Council on 11 January to examine the incident. The Caribbean Community issued a communiqué "strongly condemning the violent invasion of governmental buildings in Brasília by a misinformed crowd who reject to accept the results of free, democratic and just elections" and called for the restoration of order.

The United States embassy in Brazil referred to the protests as anti-democratic and warned its citizens to avoid the rioting. President Joe Biden described the situation as "outrageous". U.S. Secretary of State Antony Blinken condemned the calls for a coup on Twitter, writing "We condemn the attacks on Brazil's Presidency, Congress, and Supreme Court today. Using violence to attack democratic institutions is always unacceptable. We join Lula in urging an immediate end to these actions". United States National Security Advisor Jake Sullivan also condemned the attack and said that the White House was following the situation. Many American observers also compared the attack to the attempted insurrection at the American capitol two years prior. Joaquin Castro and Alexandria Ocasio-Cortez, Democratic members of the United States House of Representatives, called on the U.S. government to deport Bolsonaro, who had been taking refuge in Orlando, Florida, in the days leading up to and after Lula's swearing-in, back to Brazil for inspiring the riots.

Latin American heads of state condemned the violence, such as President Gustavo Petro of Colombia, who called for an urgent meeting of the Organization of American States in the face of what he considers an attempted "coup" by fascism, or President Gabriel Boric of Chile, who condemned the rioting as a "vile attack" and announced his full support for the government. President of Cuba Miguel Díaz-Canel condemned the riots and expressed support and solidarity with Lula and his government. A similar statement was made by Mexican president Andrés Manuel López Obrador who described the events at Brasília as "reprehensible and antidemocratic" and described the protesters as being "motivated by oligarchs". President of Venezuela Nicolás Maduro rejected the violence by "Bolsonaro's neo-fascist groups" and expressed support for Lula. Alberto Fernández, the president of Argentina, described the storming as an "attempted coup d'état" and the Vice-President of Argentina, Cristina Kirchner, compared events in Brasília with the invasion of the US capitol in January 2021. Likewise, Guillermo Lasso, President of Ecuador, condemned the "disrespectful acts of vandalism perpetrated against democratic institutions in Brasília", and expressed his support for Lula's government. Other condemnations came from the Mexican Secretary of Foreign Affairs Marcelo Ebrard, the foreign minister of Argentina, and the foreign-affairs ministries of Ecuador, Bolivia and Uruguay.

Asia 
Prime Minister of India Narendra Modi was "deeply concerned about the news of rioting and vandalism against the State institutions in Brasília". He said India extended its full support to the Brazilian authorities. The State of Palestine"condemned the recent acts of violence and terrorism in Brazil, calling them an assault on Brazilian democracy and its elected president, Luiz Inácio Lula da Silva. The state reaffirmed its support for the friendly Federative Republic of Brazil against any attempts to undermine its security or stability." Chinese Ministry of Foreign Affairs spokesman Wang Wenbin also condemned the attack and expressed support for Lula.

Europe 

European Union Foreign Affairs High Representative Josep Borrell condemned the attack on the institutions. President of the European Council Charles Michel expressed support for President Lula and condemned "the assault on the democratic institutions of Brazil." The Iberian governments, who have historical and linguistic ties with Latin America, supported Lula. Prime Minister Pedro Sánchez of Spain emphatically condemned the assault and showed support to Lula and to the democratically-elected Brazilian institutions, while the government of Portugal condemned the violence and stated its supporting of Brazilian authorities in restoring order and stability.

President of France Emmanuel Macron declared that Lula "can count on France's unwavering support". The attack was also condemned by the British Foreign Secretary James Cleverly, Italian deputy prime minister and foreign affairs minister Antonio Tajani, Austrian foreign minister Alexander Schallenberg, German Chancellor Olaf Scholz and the Turkish Ministry of Foreign Affairs. Pope Francis condemned the insurrection attempt and expressed concern for the situation in Brazil. Dmitry Peskov, the press secretary for Russian President Vladimir Putin, declared support for Lula and said Moscow condemns "in the strongest terms" the actions of those who provoked the disorder.

Oceania 
The Australian Government issued a statement condemning the attack on the Brazilian Congress, Supreme Court, and Presidential Palace. A Department of Foreign Affairs and Trade (DFAT) spokesperson described the attack as "unacceptable; democratic institutions and processes must be respected."

International organisations 
United Nations Secretary-General António Guterres condemned the assault, stating, "I condemn today's assault on Brazil's democratic institutions. The will of the Brazilian people and the country's institutions must be respected. I have full confidence that it will be. Brazil is a great democratic country." The left-wing Progressive International also condemned the attack on Twitter.

Other 
Left-wing figures and groups, such as the former Prime Minister of Greece Alexis Tsipras, former Leader of the British Labour Party Jeremy Corbyn, former President of the Workers' Party of Belgium Peter Mertens, founder of La France Insoumise Jean-Luc Mélenchon, as well as the Irish democratic socialist party Sinn Fein and the Socialist Party, a Swedish Trotskyist political organisation, expressed solidarity with Lula. American far-right political activist and former Trump administration's counselor to the president, Steve Bannon, praised those participating in the attack as "Brazilian freedom fighters".

Meta Platforms, which owns and operates Facebook and Instagram, confirmed on 9 January that they would be removing content supporting or promoting the invasion of Brazilian federal government buildings, roughly at the same time Google's YouTube confirmed it would also participate in such content takedowns. In addition, a representative from Telegram confirmed that the platform was working with the Brazilian government and fact checking groups to stop the spread of content promoting violence related to the events in Brazil.

References 

2023 in Brazil
Jair Bolsonaro
Luiz Inácio Lula da Silva